Samiran or Semiran may refer to:
 Samiran, Hamadan
 Semiran, Kurdistan